The 2000 Bausch & Lomb Championships was a women's tennis tournament played on outdoor clay courts at the Amelia Island Plantation on Amelia Island, Florida in the United States that was part of Tier II of the 2000 WTA Tour. It was the 21st edition of the tournament and was held from April 10 through April 16, 2000. Monica Seles won the singles title.

Finals

Singles

 Monica Seles defeated  Conchita Martínez 6–3, 6–2
 It was Seles' 2nd title of the year and the 46th of her career.

Doubles

 The doubles event was cancelled at the semifinal stage due to bad weather

References

External links
 ITF tournament edition details

Bausch and Lomb Championships
Amelia Island Championships
Bausch & Lomb Championships
Bausch & Lomb Championships
Bausch & Lomb Championships